Aroma is an unincorporated community in southern Newton County, in the U.S. state of Missouri. The community is on the north bank of Hickory Creek 1.5 miles east of Monark Springs. It is on Missouri Route H 2.5 miles north of Sweetwater and 4.5 miles east of Neosho.

History
A post office called Aroma was established in 1910, and remained in operation until it was discontinued in 1911. The area was so named on account of the Aromas strawberry crop produced there.

References

Unincorporated communities in Newton County, Missouri
Unincorporated communities in Missouri